A fire drill is a device to start a fire by friction between a rapidly rotating wooden rod (the spindle or shaft) and a cavity on a stationary wood piece (the hearth or fireboard).

The device can be any of the ancient types of hand-operated drills, including a hand drill, bow drill (or strap drill), or pump drill. The spindle is usually 1–2 cm thick and should end in a dull point.  The spindle and fireboard should be made from dry, medium-soft non-resinous wood such as spruce, cedar, balsam, yucca, aspen, basswood, buckeye, willow, tamarack, or similar.

Principle

Whatever the method used to drive the shaft, its lower end is placed into a shallow cavity of the fireboard with "V" notch cut into it.  The primary goal is to generate heat by the friction between the tip of the shaft and the fireboard.  Rotation speed and pressure are both important to reach this goal.  The heat eventually turns the wood at the point of contact into charcoal which is ground to a powder by the friction, that collects into the "V" notch.   Continuing operation eventually ignites the charcoal dust producing a tiny ember, which can be used to start a fire in a "tinder bundle" (a nest of stringy, fluffy, and combustible material).

Other methods of include drilling partway into a hearth made by lashing two sticks together from one side, and then drilling from the other side to meet this hole; or using the area where two branches separate. This is to keep the coal off wet or snow-covered ground.

Gallery

See also
 Firelighting#Friction
 Control of fire by early humans
 Fire piston
 Campfire

References

Relevant literature
Philips-Chan, A. Our Stories Etched in Ivory: The Smithsonian Collections of Engraved Drill Bows with Stories from the Arctic.

Firelighting
Primitive technology
Mechanical hand tools
Firelighting using friction